Rock Dunder is a tiny rock island extending just above the waters of Lake Champlain roughly  southwest from the Burlington, Vermont ferry dock. The island becomes somewhat larger at low water.

Rock Dunder and much larger nearby Juniper Island (visible in the background of the picture) are remnants of a large belt of Utica slate which once filled Lake Champlain from Shelburne to South Hero, part of a belt extending northward from the Hudson River. The base of the rock is strewn with large boulders of Winooski limestone and Laurentian gneiss.

According to Abenaki legend, Oodzee-hozo ("he who created himself") lived before the invention of legs. As he dragged his body around, he created mountains, valleys and rivers, as well as Lake Champlain, which is holy to the Abenaki. Oodzee-hozo turned himself into this rock in the lake, and there his spirit lives.

An 1896 newspaper article says the Huron and Iroquois would meet here at what they called Wujahose to make their treaties. While there is similarity between this name and the Abenakis', the question arises as to whether the Iroquois and Huron knew of or cared about the Abenaki legend and whether they would have been meeting here if they believed it was the embodiment of such a powerful spirit.

The rock has often been mistaken for another ship on the foggy lake, and legend has it parts of the rock were blasted away throughout the Revolutionary war.  Rock Dunder owes its name to one such incident.  At the height of the Battle of Plattsburgh a British vessel mistakenly fired on the rock, then obscured by fog.  When the officer discovered his mistake he is said to have cried out "It's a rock, by Dunder!", earning the place its name.

See also
Tuxis Island
Samson Rock
Lake Champlain
Tuxis Pond
Odziozo
Carleton’s Prize

References

Islands of Lake Champlain
Lake islands of Vermont
Landforms of Chittenden County, Vermont
Uninhabited islands of the United States